Siemens Digital Industries Software (formerly UGS and then Siemens PLM Software) is an American  computer software company specializing in 3D & 2D Product Lifecycle Management (PLM) software. The company is a business unit of Siemens, operates under the legal name of Siemens Industry Software Inc, and is headquartered in Plano, Texas.

History

Evolution of Siemens PLM from UGS: 1963–2007
The first commercial product developed by what is now known as Siemens PLM Software was called UNIAPT, released in 1969 by a software company then called United Computing. UNIAPT was one of the world's first end-user CAM products. United Computing was founded in 1963 above a hair salon in Torrance, California, and went on to purchase the Automated Drafting and Machining (ADAM) software code from MCS in 1973. The code became a foundation for a product called UNI-GRAPHICS, later sold commercially in 1975 as Unigraphics.

The following year, United Computing was acquired by the aerospace company McDonnell Douglas (now part of Boeing), who created new CAD/CAM divisions, naming one the Unigraphics Group. Finally, in 1980, Unigraphics was released, marking the group's first true 3D modeling hardware and software offering. Already home to McDonnell Douglas, the Unigraphics Group grew in St. Louis, Missouri, which became the new headquarters.

In 1991, the McDonnell Douglas Systems Integration groups, including Unigraphics, were acquired by EDS (then a part of General Motors Corp., later part of HP Enterprise Services, now part of DXC Technology). EDS branded the acquired business as EDS Unigraphics. Eventually, in 1997 EDS set up its Unigraphics division as a wholly owned subsidiary called Unigraphics Solutions. EDS took Unigraphics Solutions public while continuing to own majority controlling shares in Unigraphics. During this time, Unigraphics acquired a few companies itself including Engineering Animation, Inc., the former Ames, Iowa-based visualization company.

In 1999 the company acquired Applicon, a long-term player in the EDA (Electronic Design Automation) field.

Unigraphics changed its name to UGS Corporation in 2001. Also that year, EDS repurchased all outstanding UGS stock, and acquired a UGS competitor, SDRC. In 2003 UGS also received a perpetual, royalty-free license to the MSC Nastran source code.  UGS, SDRC, and Nastran were merged into a single Line of Business (LOB) named EDS PLM Solutions.

In 2004, EDS sold its EDS PLM Solutions business to the private equity group of Bain Capital, Silver Lake Partners, and Warburg Pincus. The company resumed operating under the UGS name following the private equity sale.

In 2005, UGS purchased Tecnomatix Technologies Ltd.

On January 24, 2007 the German electronics giant Siemens AG announced that they would acquire UGS for $3.5 billion. Helmuth Ludwig was appointed president and worked with the management team on creating a long-term strategic direction.

Siemens PLM: 2007–2019
The 2007 acquisition of UGS laid the foundation for the Strategic business unit of Siemens Industry Automation division - Siemens PLM Software. The entire operations of UGS were amalgamated into Siemens Automation & Drives group as Siemens PLM Software.

In October 2008, to expand its portfolio, Siemens acquired Schwelm based 'Innotec GmbH' - an international vendor of digital engineering software and services for the process industry, and known for its COMOS platform.

On November 9, 2011, Siemens announced the acquisition of 'Vistagy, Inc.' - a Massachusetts-based supplier of specialized engineering software and services with emphasis on designing and manufacturing structures made of advanced composite materials.

The Siemens Industry Automation Division has acquired the software companies UGS (USA, 2007), Innotec (Germany, 2008), Elan Software Systems (France, 2009), Active Tecnologia em Sistemas de Automação (Brazil, 2011), Vistagy (USA, 2011), IBS AG (Germany, 2012), Perfect Costing Solutions GmbH (Germany, 2012), VRcontext International S.A. (Belgium, 2012), and LMS International (Belgium, 2012).

In December 2013, in order to enhance its portfolio in the field of PLM-ERP integration and provide platform for integration with enterprise resource planning systems (such as SAP, Oracle and other enterprise applications such as MES, CRM and SCM), Siemens Industry Software Gmbh & Co. KG acquired Munich based TESIS PLMware Gmbh, in the field of PLM integration software and services.

In January 2016, Siemens announced its intention to  acquire CD-adapco for US$970 million.

In October 2016, Tony Hemmelgarn became president and CEO (his previous position was executive vice president for global sales, marketing and service delivery). Previous president and CEO, Chuck Grindstaff, became Executive Chairman (earlier Grindstaff was appointed CEO of Siemens PLM in 2010, when he succeeded the former leader, Tony Affuso).

In November 2016, Siemens announced plans to acquire EDA company Mentor Graphics for $4.5 billion to incorporate electronics integrated circuit and systems design, simulation, and manufacturing solutions into their portfolio.  Mentor Graphics became styled as "Mentor, a Siemens Business".

On October 1, 2018, Siemens announced it had acquired Low-code development platform software company Mendix to enable it to create SaaS solutions based on the Mendix platform.

Siemens Digital Industries Software: 2019-current
Announced on September 4, 2019, it was announced at the Siemens Media & Analyst Conference that the formal name of the company changed from Siemens PLM Software to Siemens Digital Industries Software.

In January 2021, the legal merger of Mentor Graphics with Siemens was completed - merging into the Siemens Industry Software Inc legal entity.  Mentor Graphics' name was changed to Siemens EDA, a division of Siemens Digital Industries Software.

In November 2022, it was announced Siemens Digital Industries Software had acquired the Tewksbury, Massachusetts-headquartered simulation-independent verification IP supplier, Avery Design Systems.

In 2023, Siemens Digital Industries Software was listed by the Special Advisory Council for Myanmar as being among the companies that had assisted the weapons production of Myanmar's military junta and could be at risk of being complicit in its violation of human rights.

Products
Siemens Digital Industries Software products include the former Siemens PLM product lines  which include NX, a CAD/CAM/CAE commercial software suite, Teamcenter, an integrated set of PLM and collaboration (cPD) tools, Tecnomatix, a manufacturing and factory planning suite and Velocity Series, an application bundle focused at the mid-market that includes Solid Edge.

The company's portfolio also contained NX I-deas, NX Nastran, Solid Edge, Imageware, Tecnomatix, Femap, D-Cubed, JT, PLM Vis, PLM XML, Simcenter 3D, Simcenter Amesim, Simcenter Flomaster, Simcenter FLOEFD, Simcenter STAR-CCM+ and Parasolid.

With the acquisition of Mentor Graphics (now Siemens EDA), the product portfolio expanded significantly to include all of the Mentor product lines which includes:
the Calibre product line for IC Physical Verification and Design for Manufacturing
the Tessent product line for Silicon Test and Yield Analysis
the Veloce product line for Hardware Assisted Verification
the Questa product line for digital simulation and verification and formal verification
Analog and AMS solutions including AFS, AFS Symphony, Solido, and Eldo
PCB layout and design tools such as PADS, Xpedition, HyperLynx and Valor NPI
as well as solutions for IC design and layout, High Level Synthesis, Power Analysis, IC Place & Route, and other areas

See also
 List of Siemens products for manufacturing IT
 Mentor Graphics

References

External links
Siemens Digital Industries Software
PLM World Unigraphics and SDRC Museums

American companies established in 2007
Software companies of the United States
Companies based in Plano, Texas
Siemens
Silver Lake (investment firm) companies
MES software
Software companies established in 2007
Bain Capital companies